National Information and Communication Technology Awards is the only state and highest prize in the Information and Communication Technology sector of Bangladesh. The award is being given since 2017.

History
The first award was given on 12 December 2017, on the first 'Information and Communication Technology Day'. The Government of Bangladesh provides the National Information and Communication Technology Awards to individuals and organizations for significant contributions to the development and development of the ICT industry. The winners are awarded crests as prizes. Before that on 2016 National ICT awards given at Digital World program by the government.

Awards by year

2017
Nine individuals and six organizations received awards in 2017:
 Muhammad Zafar Iqbal, (lifetime achievement)
 Annisul Huq, special honor (posthumous)
 Abul Kalam Azad, (health category)
 Begum Umme Salam Tanjia (civil service)
 Sheikh Abdul Aziz (Bangladesh), (software innovation)
 The City Bank (online banking)
 Service Engine Limited (software export)
 Shahjalal University of Science and Technology (education on ICT)
 Sheba.xyz (start-up in ICT)
 Toufique Imrose Khalidi, (journalism in a special category)
 Department of Agricultural Extension, (providing information services to farmers using mobile phone)
 Dhaka North City Corporation (DNCC), (for contribution to provide service to people using ICT)
 Pantho Rahaman (journalism)
 Muhammad Khan (journalism)
 Mahmudul Hasan Raju (journalism)

2016
 Syed Akhter Hossain (ICT Education and Technology)
 Mohammad Abdul Haque (journalism)

References

Bangladeshi awards
Civil awards and decorations of Bangladesh